Shelly limestone is a highly fossiliferous limestone, composed of a number of fossilized organisms such as brachiopods, bryozoans, crinoids, sponges, corals and mollusks. It varies in color, texture and hardness. Coquina is a poorly indurated form of shelly limestone.

Shelly limestone is a sedimentary rock because it is made up of fragments. To be shelly, it is full of broken shells which are "glued" together with calcite. Calcium carbonate often makes up around 10% of the volume, whilst many varied sized shells from granular to very large pebbles. Its color is gray.

Formation 
Each shelly limestone is unique in its own way, where every stone of this type is composed of different fossilized organism and shell fragments. Shelly limestones are mainly found near where marine life live or where marine life once occupied.

The unique qualities of a shelly limestone are formed with the help of calcite, acting as a sticking agent for small shell fragments, dead marine organism and other minerals. Typically, the rock is composed of approximately 10 percent calcium carbonate. The appearance of shelly limestones can differ in color, composition, hardness and texture depending on where the stone is formed. Generally, however, shelly limestones have noticeable shell fragments in various sizes. Shelly limestone is considered a carbonate rock because the stone is mainly composed primarily of carbonate minerals. In detail, shelly limestones are formed when rocks containing different minerals get weathered down then get transported to a standing body of water. From here organisms that precipitate carbon, phosphate, and silicate materials (which forms the rock's shelly texture) combine with the minerals and go through a process called deposition, where the minerals and organic components sort by size and density. Once sorted, the fragments go through diagenesis, where the fragments compress and cement together, and over time will form a shelly limestone.

Shelly limestone can be found dating back to Precambrian and Cambrian times.

Applications 
Shelly limestone can be found worldwide and are used to help identify the time period the limestone was formed, different types of organism that were alive in a specific time period, as well as, conditions of the environment based on its mineral composition. These fossil shells can also contain elements and geochemical details that can help determine changes in the climate. Other applications of limestone include being used to produce cement for roads and other foundations. Due to the stones high calcium carbonate content, it can also be used in the agricultural industry as an agent that helps reduce acidity in soil.

Bibliography 
 Matthews, SC, and Missarzhevsky, VV. (1975). "Small Shelly Fossils of Late Precambrian and Early Cambrian Age: A Review of Recent Work." Journal of the Geological Society 131.3: 289–303. https://doi.org/10.1144/gsjgs.131.3.0289 
 Brasier, MD. (1984). "Microfossils and Small Shelly Fossils from the Lower Cambrian Hyolithes Limestone at Nuneaton, English Midlands." Geological Magazine 121.3: 229–53. https://doi.org/10.1017/S0016756800028296
 Jago, JB, Zang, Wen-Long, Sun, Xiaowen, Brock, GA, Paterson, JR, and Skovsted, CB. (2006). "A Review of the Cambrian Biostratigraphy of South Australia." Palaeoworld. 15.3-4: 406–23. https://doi.org/10.1016/j.palwor.2006.10.014
 Mohammed Haneefa, K, Santhanam, Manu, and Parida, FC. (2013). "Review of Concrete Performance at Elevated Temperature and Hot Sodium Exposure Applications in Nuclear Industry." Nuclear Engineering and Design 258: 76–88. https://doi.org/10.1016/j.nucengdes.2013.01.018
 Evans, KR, and Rowell, AJ. (1990). "Small Shelly Fossils from Antarctica: An Early Cambrian Faunal Connection with Australia." Journal of Paleontology 64.5: 692–700. https://doi.org/10.1017/S0022336000018928

See also
List of types of limestone
Limestone - sedimentary rock that is composed of fragments of marine organisms
Precambrian era
Sedimentary rock - formed by the accumulation of small particles, minerals and organic particles

Notes

References 
 Shelly limestone

Limestone